Madison Araújo Costa (born 8 July 1998), simply known as Madison, is a Brazilian footballer who plays as a midfielder for Portuguesa.

Career statistics

Notes

References

External links
Madison at FK Senica's website

1998 births
Living people
Brazilian footballers
Brazilian expatriate footballers
Brazil youth international footballers
Association football midfielders
Campeonato Brasileiro Série B players
Goiás Esporte Clube players
Grêmio Novorizontino players
FK Senica players
Brazilian expatriate sportspeople in Slovakia
Expatriate footballers in Slovakia
Sportspeople from Goiás
Associação Desportiva Confiança players
Guarani FC players
Associação Portuguesa de Desportos players